The 2017 Women's Under 18 Australian Championships was a field hockey tournament held in the Tasmanian city of Hobart from 19–29 April 2017.

QLD 1 won the gold medal, defeating NSW State 2–0 in the final. WA won the bronze medal by defeating VIC 4–1 in the third place playoff.

Teams

 ACT
 NSW Blue
 NSW State
 NT
 QLD 1
 QLD 2
 SA
 TAS
 VIC
 WA

Results

Preliminary round

Pool A

Pool B

Classification round

Fifth to eighth place classification

Pool D

First to fourth place classification

Pool C

Third and fourth place

Final

Statistics

Final standings

References

External links

2017
2017 in Australian women's field hockey